Kolberg Airport  is an airstrip serving the village of Letlapeng in the Thaba-Tseka District of Lesotho.

The runway is in the shallow valley of the intermittent Khohlontso river, with higher terrain in all quadrants.

See also

Transport in Lesotho
List of airports in Lesotho

References

External links
Kolberg - FallingRain
HERE Maps - Kolberg
OpenStreetMap - Kolberg Airport
OurAirports - Kolberg

Airports in Lesotho